Elections were held in the Australian state of Queensland on 2 October 1909 to elect the members of the state's Legislative Assembly.

Key dates
The elections were held on 2 October 1909.

Results

|}

See also
 Members of the Queensland Legislative Assembly, 1909–1912

References

Elections in Queensland
1909 elections in Australia
1900s in Queensland
October 1909 events